Bruno Kernen (born 1 July 1972 in Thun, Canton of Bern) is a former Swiss alpine ski racer. In 1997, he became world champion in downhill, as well as a silver medalist in combined. In 2003, he won bronze in downhill at the world championships in St. Moritz. He won the Lauberhorn downhill race in Wengen in 2003.

At the 2006 Winter Olympics in Turin, Kernen won a bronze medal in the downhill. He also raced in the super-G, where he placed 18th.

World Cup victories
 3 wins (3 DH)
 7 podiums (4 DH, 3 K)

References

External links

 Bruno Kernan World Cup standings at the International Ski Federation

 

1972 births
Swiss male alpine skiers
Alpine skiers at the 1998 Winter Olympics
Alpine skiers at the 2002 Winter Olympics
Alpine skiers at the 2006 Winter Olympics
Olympic alpine skiers of Switzerland
Medalists at the 2006 Winter Olympics
Olympic medalists in alpine skiing
Olympic bronze medalists for Switzerland
People from Thun
Living people
Sportspeople from the canton of Bern
21st-century Swiss people